Cool Summer Reggae is an album by Aswad, released in 2002. The collection features re-recordings of their hits "Don't Turn Around" and "Shine", plus cover versions that are given the commercial Aswad treatment, including the album's first single, "Shy Guy", featuring vocals from ex-Eternal singer Easther Bennett.

Track listing
 "Night Nurse"
 "Good Thing Going"
 "Roxanne"
 "Don't Turn Around"
 "Stir It Up"
 "Lifted"
 "Uptight (Everything's Alright)"
 "Shine"
 "Would I Lie to You"
 "Weather with You"
 "Searching"
 "You Don't Love me "No No No""
 "Dancing in the Moonlight"
 "I Can See Clearly Now"
 "Shy Guy" (Featuring Easther Bennett)
 "Smokey Blues" (live)
 "Two Makes One" (live)

 NOTE – there are other versions of this album with track listing in a different order

Cover versions
track 1 "Night Nurse" – Original Gregory Isaacs
track 2 "Good Thing Going" – Original Michael Jackson
track 3 "Roxanne" – Original The Police
track 4 "Don't Turn Around" – Original Tina Turner
track 5 "Stir It Up" – Original Bob Marley & The Wailers
track 6 "Lifted" – Original Lighthouse Family
track 7 "Uptight (Everything's Alright)" – Original Stevie Wonder
track 9 "Would I Lie to You?" –  Original Charles & Eddie
track 10 "Weather with You" – Original Crowded House
track 11 "Searching" – Original China Black
track 12 "You Don't Love Me "No, No, No"" – Original Dawn Penn
track 13 "Dancing in the Moonlight" – Original – King Harvest
track 14 "I Can See Clearly Now" – Original Johnny Nash
track 15 "Shy Guy" – Original Diana King

Additional musicians
Ian Ritchie – tenor saxophone
Pete Thoms – trombone

2002 albums
Aswad (band) albums
Covers albums